Roderich Mojsisovics von Mojsvár (Graz, May 30, 1877 - Bruck an der Mur, March 30, 1953) (also referred to as Roderick Mojsisovics, Roderich Edler von Mojsvár Mojsisovics, Roderich von Mojsisovics-Mojsvár and Roderich Edmund Ladislaus Anton Julius Mojsisovics von Mojsvár) was an Austrian composer based in Graz, head of the Schule des Musikvereins für Steiermark there.

During his leadership, the Schule des Musikvereins für Steiermark was transformed in 1920 into a Conservatory. In 1939 the Conservatory was divided into two parts, now called the Kunst Universität Graz  and the Johann-Joseph-Fux Konservatorium Graz.

His works would be termed late Romantic and show the influence of Max Reger.
During his lifetime his works failed to gain wide popularity.

Origin and Family 
His grandfather Georg Mojsisovics chirurg (1799-1861), father was Felix Georg Hermann August Mojsisovics, professor of zoology (1848-1897), Mother Lily Schröer. His brother was Edgar Mojsisovics (1881-1935) Romanist.

Selected works
 Op. 1 – Fünf Lieder und Gesänge
   No. 1 Blütenschwere Kirschbaumzweige 
   No. 2 Spaziergang
   No. 4 Stelldichein
 Op. 2 – Drei Frauenchöre (3 Female Choruses)
   No. 1 Nachtgeschwätz
   No. 2 Heimliche Gewalt
 Op. 3 – Zwei Skizzen (2 Sketches) for female chorus and string orchestra (1905)
     Der Seligen Furcht
     Spätsommer
 Op. 4 – Chorus mysticus (aus Goethes Faust) for soloists, double chorus and orchestra (or organ)
 Op. 5 – Stella, Symphonic Poem for orchestra
 Op. 6 – Vier Lieder und Gesänge (4 Songs)
     Vorbei
     Die alte Jungfer
     Der jungen Hexe Lied 
     Volkslied
 Op. 7 – Fünf gemischte Chöre (5 Mixed Choruses)
 Op. 8 – Eine dramatische Szene
 Op. 9 – Romantische Phantasie for organ (1904)
 Op. 10 – Walzer (Waltzes) for small orchestra (1902–1904)
 Op. 11 – Vier Klavierstücke (4 Piano Pieces)
   No. 1 Frühlingsmorgen
   No. 2 Bauerntanz
 Op. 12 – Vier Vortragsstücke (4 Recital Pieces) for organ
     Prologus solemnis
     Praeludiom G-dur
     Capriccio Des-dur
     Kanzone g-moll
 Op. 13a – Zwei Spüche von Peter Rosegger
 Op. 13b – Drei Männerchöre (3 Male Choruses)
 Op. 14 – Kinderliederbuch
   No. 1 Wiegenlied im Freien 
   No. 2 Abendlied 
   No. 5 Kindergebet 
   No. 8 Der Rußbuttenbub
 Op. 15 – Symphony No. 1
 Op. 16 – Buntes Allerlei (1906)
   No. 1 Kleiner Marsch 
   No. 7 Kleiner Walzer
 Op. 17 – Lob des Weins
 Op. 18 – Lieder und Gesänge
   No. 4 In der Nacht (Ideenjagd)
 Op. 19 – Ninion
 Op. 20 – Die roten Dominos, Opera
 Op. 20b – Die roten Dominos, Suite from the Opera
 Op. 21 – Serenade in einem Satz (Serenade in One Movement) in A major for string trio
 Op. 22 – Zwei Vortragsstücke (2 Recital Pieces) for violin and organ
     Gebet
     Pastorale
 Op. 23 –Lieder und Gesänge (Songs)
   No. 2 Lied der heiligen Jungfrau 
   No. 3 Zwei Segel
 Op. 24 – Duett
 Op. 25 – Symphony No. 2
 Op. 26 – Miniaturen
 Op. 27 – Acht kleine Choralvorspiele zum Gebrauch beim evangelischen Gottesdienste (8 Little Chorale Preludes) for organ
 Op. 28 – Astaroth
 Op. 29 – Sonata in D major for violin and piano
 Op. 30 – Claudine von Villa Bella
 Op. 31 – Drei Vortragsstücke (3 Recital Pieces)
 Op. 35 – Tantchen Rosmarin, Opera in 4 Acts
 Op. 36 – Zur Sommerzeit, 6 Instructive Piano Pieces
 Op. 38 – Sonata in B-flat minor for organ
 Op. 40 – Concerto for violin and orchestra
 Op. 41 – Frühlingslieder, 3 Gedichte von Elsa Asenijeff for voice and piano
 Op. 45a – Lieder für das deutsche Haus
   Op. 45,a3 Der Mond als Liebespostillon
   Op. 45,b Weihnachtskantilene, Cantata for soloists, mixed chorus, string orchestra and organ
 Op. 48 – Nun segne großer Tod!, 3 Kriegslieder von F. M. Weinhandl for voice and piano
 Op. 50 – Messer Ricciardo Minutolo (Wie man Frauen überlistet), Musical Comedy in 4 Acts
 Op. 51 – Waldphantasie for 3 pianos
 Op. 52 – Bilder aus der Steiermark für Klavier
    Op. 52b Zwei Klavierstücke zum Konzertvortrag
    Op. 52,b/2 Stürmische Nacht
 Op. 54 – Totenfeier, für die Untergegangenen des Deutschen Auslandsgeschwaders for soloist, mixed chorus and orchestra (1914)
 Op. 56 – Träume am Fenster, Song Cycle for high voice and piano or orchestra (published 1925. HMB 1925, page 91)
 Op. 57 – Kammerkonzert (Chamber Concerto) for piano and string orchestra
 Op. 58 – String Quartet No. 2 (premiered 1925, Munich, Berber-Quartett) (NZM Jg 92, 1925, page 169)
 Op. 59 – Merlin, Märchendrama in 3 acts by Eduard Hoffer
 Op. 60 – Der Zauberer, Opera in 1 Act
 Op. 61 – Symphony No. 3 in G minor "Deutschland" (1920–1923)
 Op. 62 – Lustspiel-Ouverture for orchestra
 Op. 66 – Sechs Vortragsstücke (6 Recital Pieces) for organ
 Op. 69b – Zwei Gedichte (2 Poems) for male chorus a cappella
 Op. 70 – Serenade in G major for flute, violin, viola and cello
 Op. 71 – String Quartet No. 3 in C minor
 Op. 72 – Die Locke, Musikalisches Lustspiel in 1 act
 Op. 74 – Sonata in C minor for viola and piano
 Op. 75 – Anno Domini, Opera in 2 Acts
 Op. 80 – Viel Lärm um nichts, Opera in 3 Acts
 Op. 83 No. 4 – Tillenbergersage
 Op. 84 – Norden in Not
 Op. 91 – Nordische Romanze for violin and orchestra
 Op. 94 – Quintet for 2 violins, viola and 2 cellos
 Op. 95 – Lieder nach Gedichten von Rudolf Kundigraber for voice and piano
 Op. 103 – Phantasie for cello and piano or orchestra
 Op. 104 – Bukolischer Tanz for cello and piano
    No. 2 Adagio in E major
 Op. 106 –  Die graue Frau von Eggenberg, Alpenländisches, pantomimisches Tanzspiel in drei Bildern
 Op. 111 –  Vivat Allotria, Orchesterzwischenspiel aus dem 2. Akt für Großes Orch.
 Op. 117 –  Ayn Steyrisch Tafelmusicken (mit Verwendung steirischer Volkslieder) for orchestra
 Die chinesischen Mädchen, Opera buffa in 1 act (1928)
 Erinnerung an Einödsbach, 2 Marches for piano
 Fanfare der Stadt Bruck/Mur
 Intrade zu Wilhelm Kienzls 60. Geburtstage
 Julian der Gastfreund, Legende in einem Vorspiel und vier Akten (7 Bildern)
 Kanzonetta von Metastasio "La lieberta a Nice", arrangement for chorus and orchestra
 Madame Blaubart (1920)
 Vorrei morir
 Piano Concerto No. 2 in F minor?

Writings
 Thematischer Leitfaden nebst Einführung in Hans Pfitzners romantische Oper "Die Rose vom Liebesgarten" (Leipzig 1906)
 E.W. Degner (1909)
 Max Reger (1911)
 Ein wiederaufgefundenes Balett Mozarts? in Zeitschrift für Musik Jg. 96 (1929), 472
 Bach-Probleme : Polyphone Klaviermusik (Würzburg, 1930)
 Die Veränderungen der Ausdrucksfähigkeit einer Melodie bei “wandernden” Themen: ein musikdramaturgischer Versuch in Zeitschrift für Musik, Jg.99 (1932), 664–72
 Numerous Articles for the Münchener Neuesten Nachrichten c. 1935-41

References

Further reading & External links
 Austria Forum: 'Roderich von Mojsisovics-Mojsvár available at : http://www.aeiou.at/aeiou.encyclop.m/m752866.htm
 Haidmayer K.: Roderich von Mojsisovics: Leben und Werk (diss. U. of Graz, 1951) available at https://phaidra.kug.ac.at/detail_object/o:6674?SID=7688&actPage=1&type=listview&sortfield=fgs.createdDate,STRING&sortreverse=0
 Hofer Josef: Spätromatische Orgelmusik steirischer Komponisten (Mag. Art Dipl. KUG Graz, 1984)
 Klassika: Roderich Mojsisovics von Mosjvár
 Levi, E. 'Mojsisovics(-Mojsvár), Roderich Edler von' in New Grove online
 Morold M.: 'Roderich von Mojsisovics' Zeitschrift für Musik Jg. 99 ( 1932) pp. 661–4
 Steinenoth F.: 'Roderich von Mojsisovics' Zeitschrift für Musik Jg. 109 (1942) pp. 202–5

Selected Works (available online)

Sources for Autograph material
 Autograph Manuscripts, personal letters. and documents are located in the library of the Johann-Joseph-Fux Konservatorium. Bibliothek der Johann-Joseph-Fux Konservatorium
 Additional letters from Roderich Mojsisovics von Mojsvár are located in the collection of the Leipzig Music publishers C. F. Peters im Staatsarchiv Leipzig.

1877 births
1953 deaths
Austrian Romantic composers
Musicians from Graz
Austrian male classical composers
20th-century male musicians
19th-century male musicians
Edlers of Austria